Grevena (Perifereiakí Enótita Grevenón) is one of the regional units of Greece. It is part of the region of Western Macedonia. Its capital is the town of Grevena.

Geography

Grevena borders the regional units of Ioannina (Epirus) to the west, Kastoria to the northwest, Kozani to the north and east, Larissa to the southeast and Trikala to the south.

The Pindus mountains cover the western part of the regional unit. Other mountain ranges are Chasia in the south and Vourinos in the northeast. The longest river is Aliakmon which flows in the north and the east.

Administration

The regional unit Grevena is subdivided into 2 municipalities. These are (number as in the map in the infobox):
Deskati (2)
Grevena (1)

Prefecture

Grevena was created as a prefecture in 1964, out of parts of the prefectures of Kozani and Larissa. As a part of the 2011 Kallikratis government reform, the regional unit Grevena was created out of the former prefecture Grevena. The prefecture had the same territory as the present regional unit. At the same time, the municipalities were reorganised, according to the table below.

Economy

The region's economy relies on farming and agriculture. Wheat and legume crops (mostly chickpeas) cover most of the cultivated areas. Livestock production (including goat and lamb) is also strong. An increasing portion of the farming output is produced under organic farming or low input practices. Other main sources of income include ecotourism, forest industry and the ski resort of Vasilitsa, which is a popular destination for winter holidays.

Transport
Greek National Road 15, S, Cen., N
Greek National Road 26, SE
Via Egnatia (motorway)/E90, SW, Cen., NE

Demography

At the 2001 Greek census, Grevena was the least densely populated prefecture in Greece. Grevena has one of the highest rates of population decline in Greece. In 2006, there were 225 births (urban areas-160, semiurban-28 & rural -37) and 393 deaths (urban-96, semiurban-42 and rural-255). In rural areas, death rate was about 7 times the birth rate.

See also
List of settlements in the Grevena regional unit
Slavic toponyms of places in Grevena Prefecture

References

 
Prefectures of Greece
Regional units of Western Macedonia